The 1985 South Asian Games (or 2nd SAF Games) were held in Dhaka, Bangladesh from 20 December to 26 December 1985.

Participating nations 
A total of 7 countries participated in the 1985 South Asian Games.

Sports 
There were 7 official sports for the 2nd SAF Games. They were:
  Athletics
  Boxing
  Football
  Kabaddi (debut)
  Swimming
  Weightlifting
  Wrestling (debut)

Kabaddi and Wrestling were included for the first time during the 1987 games.

Medal tally

References 

 
South Asian Games
S
S
South Asian Games, 1985
1985 in Asian sport
Multi-sport events in Bangladesh
Sport in Dhaka
December 1985 sports events in Asia